Lithuania is a net energy importer. Primary energy use in Lithuania was 98 TWh, or 29 TWh per million people in 2009.

Systematic diversification of energy imports and resources is Lithuania's key energy strategy. 
Long-term aims were defined in the National Energy Independence strategy in 2012 by Lietuvos Seimas. 
It was estimated that strategic energy independence initiatives will cost 6.3–7.8 billion in total and provide annual savings of 0.9-1.1 billion.

Overview

Overview
Visaginas's Ignalina Nuclear Power Plant once provided 70% of Lithuania's electricity and exported energy to elsewhere in the Soviet Union. After the dissolution of the Soviet Union, the European Union required the country to commit to nuclear decommissioning in Visaginas for Lithuania to join. Ignalina's last plant closed in 2009, and  the country imports 73% of its energy, mostly from Norway and the United States.

Natural gas 

In order to break down Gazprom's monopoly in the natural gas market of Lithuania, Klaipėda LNG FSRU, the first large scale LNG import terminal in the Baltic region, was built in port of Klaipėda in 2014.
Equinor will be supplying 540 million cubic meters of natural gas annually from 2015 until 2020.
The terminal is able to meet all of Lithuania's demand, and 90% of Latvia's and Estonia's national demand in the future.

Gas Interconnection Poland–Lithuania (GIPL), also known as the Lithuania–Poland pipeline, a natural gas pipeline interconnection between Lithuania and Poland is under construction and is expected to be finished by 2021.

Natural gas companies in Lithuania include Lietuvos Dujos.

Electricity
Lithuania imports 70% of its power, mostly from Sweden, and the average price of electricity is among the highest in the EU. In 2015, transmission lines connected Lithuania to Sweden (700MW) and Poland (500MW). Construction of 200 MW / 200 MWh grid batteries started in 2022, to increase grid stability.

Renewable energy 

In 2016, renewable energy constituted 27.9% of the country's overall electricity generation. Previously, the Lithuanian government aimed to generate 23% of total power from renewable resources by 2020. This goal was achieved in 2014, with 23.9% of power being from renewable sources.

With new installed wind capacity of 178 MW in 2016, and an average power consumption of 1.1 GW, Lithuania was the EU Member State with the highest level of new wind capacity installed in 2016 relative to its power consumption. Studies suggest that Lithuania has the largest offshore wind potential out the three Baltic States. It is estimated that Lithuania could have up to 3.6 GW of offshore windfarms by 2050.

Kruonis Pumped Storage Plant provides energy storage, averaging electrical demand throughout the day. The pumped storage plant has a capacity of 900 MW (4 units, 225 MW each). Kaunas Hydroelectric Power Plant has 100 MW of capacity and supplies about 3% of the electrical demand in Lithuania.

See also

References

External links

 Map of Lithuanian electricity power grids